Cordella Stevenson was an African-American woman who was sexually assaulted and lynched by a mob of white men in Columbus, Mississippi on December 15, 1915.

Lynching

A barn owned by white man, Gabe Frank, was burned down in a suspected arson attack. Stevenson's son was accused of burning the barn even though he hadn't been seen in the area for months. Local police arrested Cordella Stevenson and her husband Arch Stevenson and held them for six days hoping that she would tell them where her son was.

At 10:00 PM on December 15, 1915, a mob of white men broke into their home, sexually assaulted her and hung her naked from a tree near the Mobile and Ohio Railroad.

Arch escaped on foot and ran into Columbus, but was unable to obtain aid. His fate remains unknown. No one was ever arrested for Stevenson's rape and murder.

Black women lynched 1900-1919
Black women lynched in Mississippi 1900-1919

Bibliography 
Notes

References 
 
  - Total pages: 270
  - Total pages: 189
  - Total pages: 259

Year of birth missing
1915 deaths
20th-century African-American women
20th-century African-American people
Deaths by person in Mississippi
December 1915 events
Lynching deaths in Mississippi
1915 murders in the United States
1915 in Mississippi
African-American history of Mississippi
Riots and civil disorder in Mississippi
Female murder victims
Columbus, Mississippi
Deaths by hanging
20th-century American people